Keshav R. Murugesh (born 17 August 1963) is the Group Chief Executive Officer of WNS Global Services, a NYSE listed company in the Business Process Management (BPM) business. He has been the Chairman of NASSCOM 2019-2020.

Early life and education 
Murugesh holds a Bachelor of Commerce degree and is a Fellow of The Institute of Chartered Accountants of India.

Career 
Murugesh started his career in 1989 with the Internal Audit department at ITC Limited, and progressed to become its Vice President, Finance. Murugesh joined Syntel Inc. as CFO in 2002, became its President and COO in 2004 and CEO in early 2009. In February 2010, Murugesh joined WNS Global Services as its CEO.

Awards 
Murugesh received the CA Business Leader of 2013 Award in the corporate sector by the Institute of Chartered Accountants of India (ICAI) and is a recipient of the Asia Pacific Entrepreneurship Award 2015 
He is also a recipient of the Social Entrepreneurship award at Asia's Best CSR Practices Awards 2011 for outstanding contributions as an entrepreneur to society.

Keshav has been recently recognized as CNBC Asia’s ‘India Disruptor of the Year’.

References 

Living people
Indian chairpersons of corporations
Indian accountants
1963 births
Andhra University alumni